Carl Karlweis, originally Karl Weiss (23 November 1850, in Vienna – 27 October 1901, in Vienna) was an Austrian dramatist and short story writer. Of Jewish ancestry, he converted to Protestantism in 1889.

Biography 
He was originally an employee of the Imperial Royal Privileged Austrian State Railway Company in Graz. He switched to the Galician Railway of Archduke Charles Louis in 1869. From 1891, he was the Chief Inspector for the Austrian Southern Railway Company. 

He wrote numerous short tales and novels, some in the Viennese dialect.

For many years he suffered from a serious stomach problem. It was a major success. He died a few months later, after taking the "cure" at the spa in Lovran. 

He was married to Emilie, née Kraus (1864-1938).

In 1919, a street in Vienna's Währing district was named after him.

References

Further reading 
 
 Heinrich Glücksmann: "Erinnerung an Karlweis". In: Neues Wiener Journal, Nr.10920, April 1924, pg.6.
 Peter Sprengel: Geschichte der deutschsprachigen Literatur 1870–1900. Von der Reichsgründung bis zur Jahrhundertwende, Vol.9. C. H. Beck, Munich 1998, pg.428..

External links 

 
 
 

1850 births
1901 deaths
Austrian male writers
Austrian dramatists and playwrights
Austrian short story writers
Austrian Southern Railway Company
Writers from Vienna